Ņikita Ivanovs (born 25 March 1996) is a Latvian international footballer who plays for FK Jelgava, as a striker.

Career
He has played club football for Skonto FC, FK RFS and FS METTA/Latvijas Universitāte.

After playing for the Latvian under-21 team, he made his international debut for the Latvia in 2018.

Ivanovs joined FK Jelgava for the 2019 season.

References

1996 births
Living people
Latvian footballers
Latvia under-21 international footballers
Latvia international footballers
Skonto FC players
FK RFS players
FS METTA/Latvijas Universitāte players
FK Jelgava players
Latvian Higher League players
Association football forwards